Lleufer was a quarterly Welsh-language literary magazine published by the Welsh branch of the Workers’ Educational Association, Cymdeithas Addysg y Gweithwyr yng Nghymru. It contained general and academic articles, book reviews, poetry and fiction, advertisements and society notes. It was published between 1944 and 1979.

The journal is being digitized by the Welsh Journals Online project at the National Library of Wales.

External links 
 Lleufer at Welsh Journals Online

Literary magazines published in Wales
Magazines established in 1944
Welsh-language magazines
Magazines disestablished in 1979
Defunct literary magazines published in the United Kingdom